Jury Rupin (October 1, 1946, Krasnyi Lyman, USSR (now Lyman, Ukraine) – October 22, 2008, Vilnius, Lithuania) was a photographer, artist, writer.

Biography

Early life and education
Born on October 1, 1946 in Krasnyi Lyman, USSR (now Lyman, Ukraine).
He got his first camera in 1958, started doing photography straight after.
From 1961 to 1965 he studied in Slavyanskiy technical college.
He served in the Soviet army from 1965 to 1968 (Tbilisi, Yerevan).
From 1969 to 1974 he studied in Kharkov Polytechnical Institute.
from 1979 to 1985 he studied in Saint Petersburg at the Imperial Academy of Arts.

Career
In 1974–1976 Jury co-founded a famous art group "Vremya group" ("Time") in Kharkiv.
From 1971 to 1985 he worked as a correspondent for "TASS", "Evening Kharkiv", "Red Flag", Kharkiv advertising combine.
In 1990 until 1993, together with Aleksandr Maziuk, he opened the first private gallery in the USSR (Tallinn, Estonia).
From 1994 to 2001 he was managing director of the "Rupincom" stock photo agency.

He died in Vilnius, Lithuania at aged 62.

Recent exhibitions and publications
 Illustration for "How to think like a Russian" by Nobel laureate Svetlana Alexievich in the Telegraph, London 2016
 "Borderline. Ukrainian Art 1985–2004", PinchukArtCentre, Kiev 30 May 2015 – 4 October 2015
 Photography Day at London Art Fair 2009
 HotShoe International (February – March 2009 issue) – Front Cover
 EYEMAZING Magazine (Issue 02 2009) – Article, including 6 photos

Past Exhibitions (1974–1976)
In a very short 2-year period Jury's work has been successfully exhibited all around the world. Many works have collected exhibition awards.
In 1976 the KGB has completely sealed any channels of sending Jury's photos abroad after a nude photo was discovered by a KGB agent in a package of photos sent for an exhibition.

Australia
 Interphot 76 (Norwood South)

Angola
 Grupo Desportivo e Curtural Da Sesil Do Ultramar (Luanda)

Argentina
 Foto Club Buenos Aires (Buenos Aires)
 Foto Club Argentino (Buenos Aires)
 SalonInternational De Art Fotografico (Buenos Aires)

Belgium
 2nd world festival of photographic arts
 Fotoclub Virton
 Virton-76

Brazil
 Sosiedade Fluminense de Fotografia

Czechoslovakia
 III INFOTA 1974 (Jičín)
 IV INFOTA 1976, (Jičín)
 Fotoforum Ruzomberok
 Fotografia Academica
 Vitkovice-74 (Ostrava)

Denmark
 Den XIX (Havdrup)
 The Society of Photographic Art (Havdrup)

France
 4-e Salon de Photographies (Nîmes)
 5eme Salon International D'art Photographique 1976 (Nîmes)
 Bordeaux
 Cine Flach Club, Vincennes
 Coupe charles phate
 F.N.S.P.F, Paris
 Macon
 Mautes la Zolie
 Photo9club ARTEK Moucron, Hersea
 Salon International photographique (Bordeaux)

GDR
 6 Bifota (Berlin)

Germany
 FotoFilmeclub (Kapellen)
 "Photokona" (Köln)
 International Neusser fotowochen

Holland
 Fotomundi

India
 PSMP, International Salon ( Bhopal)

Italy
 Gruppo Fotografico Toro (Torino)

Japan
 Asahy Shimbun (Tokyo)

Poland
 Małe formaty 74
 V Salon Portretu Artystycznego
 Venus-74 (Kraków)
 Venus-75 (Kraków)

Portugal
 Repartição de Cltura e Turismo (Porto)

Spain
 Europa75 bienale de fotografia
 Fotosport76 (Reus)
 Sociedad Fotográfica Zaragoza

Sri Lanka
 The Exhibition Photographic Society of Sri Lanka

Switzerland
 Photo Club Aigle (Aigle)
 Photo Club St-Gallem

Romania
 Asociatia artiştilor fotografi (București)

United Kingdom
 Edinburgh Photographic Society
 International Exhibition of Pictorial Photography

USA
 18th Wichita International Salon of Photography
 Bristol Salon of Photography
 Mississippi Valley (St. Louise)
 Northwest International (Washington)
 Wichita international exhibition of photography

Yugoslavia
 Foto klub Natron (Maglai)
 Sterijino Pozorje (Novi Sad)

The "Vremya group" ("Time"), Kharkiv
Jury Rupin is the founder of an art group "Vremya group" – well known both in Ukraine and the USSR (1974–1976).
The group has consisted of such photographers as Eugeny Pavlov, Oleg Malevanny, Aleksandr Suprun, Gennady Tubalev, Boris Mikhailov, Aleksandr Sitnichenko and later – Anatoly Makienko.

Vremya group (Kharkiv) exhibited at Student palace, Kharkiv, USSR, 1987, and "Сarte blanche a Boris Mikhailov" in Cite Internationale des Arts, Paris (September – October) 1999,

References

External links
 Jury Rupin's site
 Photographer's diary in the KGB archives (Russian)
 Jury Rupin – Literature (Russian)
 Jury Rupin – Photos
 Jury Rupin – Photographer.Ru
 Tatyana Pavlova, Kharkov Photography and its Vremya group. (Russian)

People from Lyman, Ukraine
Ukrainian emigrants to Lithuania
Ukrainian photographers
Ukrainian writers
Ukrainian artists
Russian artists
Photography in Lithuania
1946 births
2008 deaths